The Roman Catholic Church in Portugal is composed only of a Latin hierarchy, joint in the national episcopal conference of Portugal (Conferência Episcopal Portuguesa ), consisting of 
 three ecclesiastical provinces, headed by Metropolitan Archbishops (one of which (Lisbon) holds the superior rank of Patriarch), with a total of 17 suffragan dioceses.  
 an exempt military ordinariate.

There are no Eastern Catholic jurisdictions.

There is also an Apostolic Nunciature to Portugal as papal diplomatic representation (embassy-level), in the national capital Lisbon.

Current Latin Dioceses

Exempt : immediately subject to the Holy See 
 Military Ordinariate of Portugal (Ordinariato Castrense de Portugal : army bishopric)

Defunct jurisdictions

Titular sees 
 Seven (Latin) Episcopal Titular bishoprics : Aquæ flaviæ, Diocese of Caliábria, Diocese of Dume, Diocese of Elvas, Diocese of Magnetum, Diocese of Penafiel, Diocese of Pinhel

Other defunct sees 
 Diocese of Betecas, Diocese of Egitânia, Diocese of Elbora, Diocese of Miranda, Diocese of Olisipo, Diocese of Ossonoba, Diocese of Portucale, Diocese of Salácia, Diocese of Silves (Algarve precursor of present Faro).

See also 
 List of Catholic dioceses (structured view)

Sources and external links 
 GCatholic.org - data for all sections.
 Catholic-Hierarchy entry.

Portugal
Catholic dioceses